Schönhausen is a municipality in the Mecklenburgische Seenplatte district, in Mecklenburg-Vorpommern, Germany.

References